David Dwane Rollins (born December 21, 1989) is an American former professional baseball pitcher. He played in Major League Baseball (MLB) for the Seattle Mariners.

Career

Toronto Blue Jays
Rollins was drafted in the 2008, 2009 and 2010 Major League Baseball Drafts and did not sign either time. After being drafted by the Toronto Blue Jays in the 2011 Draft he signed.

Houston Astros
In July 2012, he was traded from the Blue Jays to the Houston Astros with Francisco Cordero, Ben Francisco, Asher Wojciechowski, Joe Musgrove, Carlos Pérez, and a player to be named later (Kevin Comer) for J. A. Happ, Brandon Lyon, and David Carpenter.

Seattle Mariners
The Seattle Mariners selected Rollins from the Astros after the 2014 season in the Rule 5 Draft. On March 27, 2015, Rollins was suspended 80 games for testing positive for stanozolol, a performance-enhancing drug. Rollins was activated from the suspended list and made his major league debut on July 4, 2015.

Chicago Cubs
On November 18, 2016, the Chicago Cubs claimed Rollins off waivers.

Texas Rangers
He was designated for assignment by the Cubs, and claimed by the Texas Rangers on November 22.

Philadelphia Phillies
On December 2, the Philadelphia Phillies claimed Rollins off waivers from the Rangers. He was designated for assignment by the Phillies on December 14.

Second Stint with Rangers
On December 21, the Rangers claimed Rollins for the second time.

Second Stint with Cubs
On December 23, 2016, Rollins was claimed off of waivers by the Chicago Cubs. He was designated for assignment by the Cubs on February 8, 2017. On August 4, Rollins was released by the Cubs.

Sussex County Miners
On February 14, 2018, Rollins signed with the Sussex County Miners of the Can-Am League.

Second Stint with Mariners
On August 14, 2018, Rollins' contract was purchased by the Seattle Mariners organization. He elected free agency on November 2, 2018.

See also
List of Major League Baseball players suspended for performance-enhancing drugs

References

External links

1989 births
Living people
American expatriate baseball players in Canada
American sportspeople in doping cases
Baseball players from Texas
Baseball players suspended for drug offenses
Bluefield Blue Jays players
Cangrejeros de Santurce (baseball) players
Corpus Christi Hooks players
Iowa Cubs players
Lancaster JetHawks players
Lansing Lugnuts players
Liga de Béisbol Profesional Roberto Clemente pitchers
Lexington Legends players
Major League Baseball pitchers
Oklahoma City RedHawks players
People from Panola County, Texas
Peoria Javelinas players
San Jacinto Central Ravens baseball players
San Jacinto North Gators baseball players
Seattle Mariners players
Sussex County Miners players
Tacoma Rainiers players
Vancouver Canadians players